The 1923 Western State Normal Hilltoppers football team represented Western State Normal School (later renamed Western Michigan University) as an independent during the 1923 college football season.  In their second and final season under head coach Milton Olander, the Hilltoppers compiled a 6–1–1 record and outscored their opponents, 160 to 21. Halfback Harry Potter was the team captain.

Schedule

References

Western State Normal
Western Michigan Broncos football seasons
Western State Normal Hilltoppers football